Rosina Amenebede (born 24 December 1985) is a Ghanaian athlete specializing in 100-metre hurdles.

Biography 
Amenebede was born in 1985. She got her degree at Middle Tennessee State University in Community and Public Health, before becoming an assistant coach at UALR in 2013. She ran short distances for the Blue Raiders from 2011 to 2013. Amenebede has run in the Commonwealth Games, World Championships, African Championships, All-Africa Games and the World Junior Championships all for Ghana. These events have taken her all over the world, including trips to Asia, Australia, Africa and Hungary.

Titles

Records

References

External links 
 

Ghanaian female athletes
Living people
1985 births
Middle Tennessee State University alumni
Commonwealth Games medallists in athletics
Commonwealth Games silver medallists for Ghana
Athletes (track and field) at the 2010 Commonwealth Games
Athletes (track and field) at the 2007 All-Africa Games
African Games competitors for Ghana
Medallists at the 2010 Commonwealth Games